In mathematics, a factor system (sometimes called factor set) is a fundamental tool of Otto Schreier’s classical theory for group extension problem. It consists of a set of automorphisms and a binary function on a group satisfying certain condition (so-called cocycle condition). In fact, a factor system constitutes a realisation of the cocycles in the second cohomology group in group cohomology.

Introduction 
For a group extension
 
there exists a factor system which consists of a function  and homomorphism  such that it makes the cartesian product  a group  as
 
So  must be a "group 2-cocycle" (symbolically). In fact,  does not have to be abelian, but the situation is more complicated for non-abelian groups

Application: for Abelian field extensions 
Let G be a group and L a field on which G acts as automorphisms.  A cocycle or (Noether)  factor system is a map c: G × G → L* satisfying

Cocycles are equivalent if there exists some system of elements a : G → L* with

Cocycles of the form

are called split.  Cocycles under multiplication modulo split cocycles form a group, the second cohomology group H2(G,L*).

Crossed product algebras
Let us take the case that G is the Galois group of a field extension L/K.  A factor system c in H2(G,L*) gives rise to a crossed product algebra A, which is a K-algebra containing L as a subfield, generated by the elements λ in L and ug with multiplication

Equivalent factor systems correspond to a change of basis in A over K.  We may write

The crossed product algebra A is a central simple algebra (CSA) of degree equal to [L : K]. The converse holds: every central simple algebra over K that splits over L and such that deg A = [L : K]  arises in this way.  The tensor product of algebras corresponds to multiplication of the corresponding elements in H2.  We thus obtain an identification of the Brauer group, where the elements are classes of CSAs over K, with H2.

Cyclic algebra
Let us further restrict to the case that L/K is cyclic with Galois group G of order n generated by t.  Let A be a crossed product (L,G,c) with factor set c.  Let u = ut be the generator in A corresponding to t.  We can define the other generators 

and then we have un = a in K.  This element a specifies a cocycle c by

It thus makes sense to denote A simply by (L,t,a).  However a is not uniquely specified by A since we can multiply u by any element λ of L* and then a is multiplied by the product of the conjugates of λ.  Hence A corresponds to an element of the norm residue group K*/NL/KL*.  We obtain the isomorphisms

References

 
 
 
 

Cohomology theories
Group theory